Battalion is a 1927 Czechoslovak social drama film directed by Přemysl Pražský.

Plot
Lawyer František Uher discovers his wife is cheating on him. He leaves home and goes to a low-class pub 'Battalion' where he meets various characters from the bottom of the society. He becomes their defender.

Production
Battalion is an adaptation of a short story and later a play by Josef Hais-Týnecký. The story was inspired by a real life of 19th century lawyer and member of parliament František Uher who ended up as an alcoholic and a beggar. The film was shot in A-B studio in Vinohrady and in Kavalírka studio. The outdoor scenes were shot in the streets of Prague.

Cast
 Karel Hašler as Lawyer František Uher
 Bronislava Livia as Uher's wife Zdenka
 Vladimír Pospíšil-Born as Lover of Uher's Wife
 Karel Noll as Former soldier Vondra
 Eman Fiala as Tuberculosis patient Eda
 Eugen Wiesner as Former actor Mušek
 Karel Švarc as Dog thief Bylina
 Josef Wanderer as Judge
 Nelly Kovalevská as Judge's daughter Olga
 Rudolf Růžička as Olga's fiancée Alfréd
 Vladimír Smíchovský as Bricklayer Rokos
 Roza Schlesingerová as Rokos' wife

Release
The film's premiere was held in cinema Olympic in Prague, on 25 December 1927. Communist journalist Julius Fučík criticized the film for being too sentimental and distasteful, but praised the technical qualities. Today Battalion is considered one of the best Czech silent films.
The film was released on DVD in 2017 with newly recorded music by Kryštof Mařatka.

References

External links
 

1927 films
1927 drama films
Czechoslovak drama films
Czechoslovak black-and-white films
Czech silent films
Czech drama films
1920s Czech-language films
Silent drama films